Carditamera is a genus of molluscs in the family Carditidae.

It is the type genus of the subfamily Carditamerinae.
Byssomera is a junior synonym or subgenus of Carditamera but has sometimes been written as a subgenus of Cardita, due to its type species having been synonymised from Cardita (Byssomera) affinis to Carditamera (Byssomera) affinis.

Species
 Carditamera affinis (G.B. Sowerby I, 1833)
 Carditamera arata (Conrad, 1838)
 Carditamera contigua (Dautzenberg, 1910)
 Carditamera gracilis (Shuttleworth, 1856) – West Indian cardita
 Carditamera plata (Ihering, 1907)
 Carditamera radiata (G.B. Sowerby I, 1833)

References

Carditidae
Bivalve genera